Undertow was a straight edge hardcore punk band from Seattle, Washington, active during the early and mid-1990s. They released material on Indecision Records, Bloodlink Records, Excursion Records and Overkill Records. Indecision Records released a comprehensive discography entitled Everything, which has 28 tracks spanning Undertow's entire active period with John Pettibone on vocals. RevHQ described them as 'founding fathers of Seattle straight edge'.

Members
John Pettibone- vocals
Mark Holcomb- guitar
Demian Johnston- bass guitar
Ryan Murphy- drums

Former
Joel DeGraff - vocals
Seth Linstrum - guitar
James Stern - bass guitar

Discography

Undertow 1990 Demo (Cassette) - Self-Released
The Extinction of All That Is Holy (7" Vinyl) - Overkill Records
Conditioned - Undertow/Resolution split (7" Vinyl) - Overkill Records
Edge of Quarrel (7" Vinyl) - 1991, Overkill Records
Undertow 1992 Demo (Cassette) - Self-Released
Undertow/Struggle Split (7" Vinyl) - 1993, Bloodlink Records
Stalemate (CDEP/7" Vinyl) - 1993, Excursion Records
At Both Ends (CD/LP) - 1994, Excursion Records
Control (CDEP/7" Vinyl) - 1994, Overkill Records
Undertow (7" Vinyl) - 2004, Indecision Records
Everything Discography (CD/2xLP) - 2004, Indecision Records
WSPC 1993 Live Performance (Cassette) - 2012, Dead Accents

References

External links
 Undertow on Indecision Records website
 Undertow on Allmusic

Musical groups established in 1991
Musical groups disestablished in 2004
Metalcore musical groups from Washington (state)
Straight edge groups
1991 establishments in Washington (state)
Hardcore punk groups from Washington (state)